István Müller (born 27 May 1883, date of death unknown) was a Hungarian cyclist. He competed in two events at the 1912 Summer Olympics.

References

External links
 

1883 births
Year of death missing
Hungarian male cyclists
Olympic cyclists of Hungary
Cyclists at the 1912 Summer Olympics
Cyclists from Budapest